Andrew Stewart (April 6, 1836 – October 18, 1903) was a Republican member of the U.S. House of Representatives from Pennsylvania.

Biography 
Andrew Stewart (son of Congressman Andrew Stewart) was born in Uniontown, Pennsylvania. He attended Sewickley Academy in Sewickley, Pennsylvania, and Madison College in Uniontown. He studied medicine and attended Jefferson Medical College in Philadelphia, Pennsylvania. During the American Civil War he enlisted as a private in the Eighty-fifth Regiment, Pennsylvania Volunteer Infantry, and served throughout the war. He was an unsuccessful candidate for election in 1874. He presented credentials as a Republican Member-elect to the Fifty-second Congress and served from March 4, 1891, to February 26, 1892, when he was succeeded by Alexander K. Craig, who contested his election. He was again an unsuccessful candidate to the same congress to fill the vacancy caused by the death of Alexander Craig. He was later engaged in the manufacture of paper pulp and lumber. He died in Stewarton, Springfield Township, Pennsylvania. Interment in Union Cemetery in Uniontown.

References 
 Retrieved on 2008-02-14
The Political Graveyard

External links 

1836 births
1903 deaths
People from Uniontown, Pennsylvania
Union Army soldiers
Republican Party members of the United States House of Representatives from Pennsylvania
Sewickley Academy alumni
19th-century American politicians